Ruth Machado Lousada Rocha (born March 2, 1931 in São Paulo), most known as Ruth Rocha is a Brazilian writer of children's books. 
Together with Lygia Bojunga, Ana Maria Machado and Eva Furnari  she is one of the leading exponents of the new wave of Brazilian children's literature. Rocha graduated in Political Sociology at the University of São Paulo and postgraduated in Educational Orientation in the Pontifical Catholic University of São Paulo. She became a member of the Paulista Academy of Arts since October 25, 2007, occupying the chair 38.

Work
She debuted in the literary field in 1967, writing articles for several magazines on education, among them  Cláudia. In 1976, she published her first book entitled Palavras Muitas Palavras .

Her current work has more than 130 published titles, 500 editions and translations to over 25 languages; also, it has sold about 17.5 million copies in Brazil and 2.5 million copies overseas.  One of her best known works is Marcelo, Marmelo, Martelo, which has sold more than two million copies.

Honors and Prizes
In 1998 she was honored by former President Fernando Henrique Cardoso with the Order of Cultural Merit from the Ministry of Culture of Brazil. In 2002 she was elected as a member of PEN CLUB - World Association of Writers in Rio de Janeiro. That same year, her book  Escrever e Criar received the Jabuti Prize of Literature.

Some of her published works
Marcelo, Marmelo, Martelo
O Reizinho Mandão
SapoViraReiViraSapo, ou a volta do Reizinho Mandão
Catapimba
Meus Lápis de Cor São Só Meus
Meu Irmãozinho Me Atrapalha
A Menina que Não Era Maluquinha
O Menino que Quase Virou Cachorro
Borba, o Gato
Escolinha do Mar
Faz Muito Tempo
O Que os Olhos Não Vêem
Procurando Firme
Gabriela e a Titia
Pra Vencer Certas Pessoas
Historinhas Malcriadas
A Arca de Noé
As Coisas que a Gente Fala
Bom Dia, Todas as Cores!
Como se Fosse Dinheiro
Davi Ataca Outra Vez
Este Admirável Mundo Louco
Faca Sem Ponta Galinha Sem Pé
Romeu e Julieta

References

External links
Official page (in Portuguese)
Ruth Rocha profile on Itaú Cultural (in Portuguese)

Living people
1931 births
Brazilian children's writers
20th-century Brazilian women writers
21st-century Brazilian women writers
21st-century Brazilian writers
Brazilian women children's writers